Terminalia calamansanai, also spelled Terminalia calamansanay, is a species of plant in the family Combretaceae.  It has a large range in SE Asia, from Bangladesh to New Guinea.

References

External links
 
 

calamansanai
Flora of Indo-China
Taxa named by Francisco Manuel Blanco